Metaswitch Networks is a private UK-based company which was acquired by Microsoft in July 2020. Metaswitch Networks designed, developed, manufactured, and marketed telecommunications software to communication service providers, equipment manufacturers and large enterprises.

Corporate history

Metaswitch (formerly Data Connection Ltd) was founded in 1981 by seven former IBM employees led by Ian Ferguson, who remained on the board of directors until the company's acquisition by Microsoft. The company's earliest business areas included IBM Systems Network Architecture (SNA) and retail point of sale systems. In the 1990s, the company began developing network protocol software.

In 2000, the company launched the Metaswitch brand, which provided softswitches and network management systems designed to enable telephone service providers to migrate to Voice over IP (VoIP) networks while still supporting legacy telephone technologies. By 2008, the Metaswitch division was responsible for 78% of the company's revenue.

In April 2009, the company announced intentions to consolidate all of its products and business operations under the Metaswitch brand, with two business units: the Carrier Systems Division and Network Protocol Division. In October 2009, the company rebranded itself as Metaswitch Networks, to reflect the growing focus on the products and services that it sells to telephone service providers.

In August 2011, the company formally changed its name from Data Connection Ltd to Metaswitch Networks Ltd.

In July 2014, the company moved some of its software to open-source with the launch of Project Calico.

In May 2020, Microsoft announced a definitive agreement to acquire Metaswitch Networks. On 15 July 2020, the acquisition was completed.

Acquisitions

In March 2010, the firm acquired AppTrigger Inc, a provider of service broker software in Richardson, Texas. In April 2011, it acquired Colibria AS, a provider of Rich Communication Suite (RCS) software in Oslo, Norway. In February 2017, Metaswitch acquired OpenCloud Ltd, a provider of an open mobile services platform.

Ownership and investors

In 1987, Metaswitch established the Employee Benefit Trust (EBT) to hold shares of the company on behalf of the employees, which enabled company-wide profit sharing.

In January 2008 Francisco Partners, a private equity firm, and Sequoia Capital, a venture capitalist firm, invested an undisclosed sum in Metaswitch.

References

External links
 Official Website

Networking companies
Networking software companies
Telecommunications equipment vendors
Companies based in the London Borough of Enfield
British companies established in 1981
Telecommunications companies established in 1981
Software companies established in 1981
2020 mergers and acquisitions
Microsoft acquisitions
Microsoft subsidiaries
British subsidiaries of foreign companies
Software companies based in London